Kilivila (Kiriwina) is one of the Kilivila–Louisiades languages (of the Austronesian language family), spoken by the Trobriand people of the Trobriand Islands (Papua New Guinea). It is used in local schools.

Phonology 
Phonology of Kilivila:

Consonants

Vowels

Allophones

References

External links 
 A number of collections in Paradisec include materials in Kilivila

Papuan Tip languages
Languages of Milne Bay Province
Trobriand Islands